Ashton Constant (born 28 September 1983) is a South African rugby union player, who most recently playing with the . His regular position is prop or hooker.

Career

Youth

Western Province
Constant was included in the  squad for the 2004 Vodacom Shield competition and made his senior debut in 2004. He played a total of five matches for Western Province.

Pumas
He immediately became a permanent fixture in the first team, making twelve appearances in the 2006 Currie Cup Premier Division season. He continued regularly playing for the Pumas throughout the 2007 and 2008 seasons, accumulating 47 caps for them.

SWD Eagles
In 2009, Constant joined George-based side , making ten appearances in the 2009 Vodacom Cup and 2009 Currie Cup First Division competitions.

Boland Cavaliers

Durbanville-Bellville
In 2015, Constant joined Western Province club side Durbanville-Bellville and was a member of the squad that won the 2015 SARU Community Cup competition, scoring two tries in six appearances in the competition.

Representative rugby
Constant also represented South Africa at some levels, playing in the 2004 Under-21 World Championships in 2004, playing for an Emerging Springboks side at the 2007 IRB Nations Cup and the victorious South Africa President's XV team at the 2013 IRB Tbilisi Cup.

References

South African rugby union players
Living people
1983 births
Rugby union players from Cape Town
Western Province (rugby union) players
Pumas (Currie Cup) players
Lions (United Rugby Championship) players
SWD Eagles players
Boland Cavaliers players
Rugby union props